Waqt is a  1965 Indian Hindi-language drama film directed by Yash Chopra, produced by B. R. Chopra and written by Akhtar Mirza and Akhtar-Ul-Iman. It made it onto the BFI's long list of films in consideration for their top ten of Indian films award. The film stars Sunil Dutt, Raaj Kumar, Shashi Kapoor, Sadhana Shivdasani, Sharmila Tagore, Balraj Sahni, Achala Sachdev, Rehman and Madan Puri in lead roles. It pioneered the concept of films with multiple stars, starting a trend followed by other films. The film took the top spot at the box office in 1965. The plot of this movie re-introduced the lost and reunite formula in Bollywood, originally featured in the 1943 Ashok Kumar, Mumtaz Shanti starrer Kismet (fate). A happy family separated by Waqt (time) goes through a series of trials trying to reunite. The film was later remade into the Telugu as Bhale Abbayilu (1969) and in Malayalam as Kolilakkam (1981).

It is still considered one of the blockbuster movies of actress Sadhana. The film contains the Hindi songs "Hum Jab Simat Ke", sung by Mahendra Kapoor and Asha Bhosle, Waqt se din aur raat, sung by Mohammed Rafi, Aage Bhi Jaane Na Tu, sung by Asha Bhosle and Ae Meri Zohra Jabeen, sung by Manna Dey, composed by Ravi and picturised on Balraj Sahni and Achala Sachdev.

Plot 

Lala Kedarnath Prasanta is a wealthy businessman living with his wife Laxmi and three little sons, who were born on same date, same month but few years apart each other. On their birthday, Lala Kedarnath is visited by Pandit Uday Shankar (Badri Prasad), a well-known astrologer who advises him not to be proud of his wealthy lifestyle or be too optimistic about the future as the actions of "time" is unpredictable. Lala Kedarnath ignores his advice and is busy making plans of becoming even more wealthier. That night, as he is discussing his future plans with Laxmi, a sudden earthquake takes place and the whole town crumbles, knocking Lala Kedarnath unconscious. After regaining consciousness, he discovers that his house is destroyed and his family is gone. The eldest son Raja ends up in an orphanage while the middle-born son Ravi is adopted from the streets by a rich couple. Elsewhere, the youngest son Vijay is still with Laxmi who thinks Lala Kedarnath died in the earthquake and the two continue living in poverty. Lala Kedarnath traces Raja to the orphanage only to learn that he has fled as the manager (Jeevan Dhar) ill-treated him. Frustrated, he chokes the manager to death and is arrested by the police. As the police drive away with Lala Kedarnath, Raja is shown running on the streets alone.

Several years later, Raja Chinnoy is shown as a sophisticated thief working for a criminal named Chinnoy Seth. He steals the expensive necklace of a beautiful rich girl named Meena Mittal but returns it to her upon learning that it was her birthday gift. He falls in love with her and decides to give up crime for her. However, things take a turn when a spoilt rich boy named Ravi Khanna enters Meena's life and attempts to woo her. Meanwhile, Lala Kedarnath is released from jail and is informed by his neighbour that his long-lost wife Laxmi is in Delhi. He travels there but is informed that her son Vijay has taken her to Mumbai for a treatment as she is diagnosed with cancer. He arrives over there in order to search for his family. Elsewhere, Meena falls in love with Ravi and the two decide to get married, infuriating Raja. On the night before their engagement, he enters an asleep Ravi's house to murder him but finds his childhood photograph. Upon seeing it, Raja realises that Ravi is his long-lost brother and leaves from his house. Ravi and Meena's marriage is finalized. However, Meena's parents tell Ravi's foster parents that they wish to break off Meena's engagement upon discovering that Ravi is of unknown parentage and religion. Heartbroken, Ravi leaves his house after an argument with his foster sister Renu Khanna over dating Vijay who works as a chauffeur for Chinnoy Seth in order to arrange money for Laxmi's surgery. Raja learns about Ravi's problem and decides to reveal their relation at a party organized by Chinnoy Seth. However, Chinnoy Seth's drunk employee Balbir Singh misbehaves with Meena over there and Raja gets into a fight with him, causing the party to get cancelled. Later that night, Balbir gets into a fight with Chinnoy Seth in a drunken state and in self-defense, Chinnoy Seth ends up stabbing Balbir fatally from his knife. He decide to frame Raja for the murder in order to cover up his crime. Vijay witnesses Chinnoy Seth dragging Balbir's corpse to Raja's house but is shut up with the promise of money for Laxmi's surgery. Raja is arrested by the police and he asks Ravi to defend him as a lawyer, to which, he agrees. During the procedure of the court case, Chinnoy Seth lies that Vijay woke him up to inform him about Balbir's murder and that he witnessed Raja hiding the corpse in the wardrobe. Vijay also gives a false statement that he witnessed Raja dragging Balbir's corpse to his house. Lala Kedarnath appears in the court as well for catching Raja on the streets when he attempted to flee from the police. Vijay ends up confessing Chinnoy Seth's true intentions after he is confronted by Ravi over his mother's illness. Chinnoy Seth, brainwashed by Ravi, blurts out the truth in the courtroom and is convicted for Balbir's murder. Raja is proved innocent and Lala Kedarnath thanks Ravi for his deeds. Laxmi subsequently arrives in the court to apologise to Raja on behalf of Vijay. Lala Kedarnath spots her over there and has an emotional reunion with her. She even introduces Vijay as his youngest son to him. He narrates to them that he had traced his eldest son to an orphanage but he had already fled from there. Raja overhears him and realises that he is his father. He introduces himself as his eldest son and Ravi as his middle-born son to Lala Kedarnath. The two emotionally reunite with Lala Kedarnath with Laxmi and Vijay. Ravi's marriage is also fixed with Meena again. In the end, they all build a rich house and live happily thereafter.

Cast
 Raaj Kumar as Raja 
 Sunil Dutt as Advocate Ravi
 Shashi Kapoor as Vijay
 Sadhana as Meena Mittal
 Sharmila Tagore as Renu Khanna
 Balraj Sahni as Lala Kedarnath 
 Achala Sachdev as Laxmi 
 Rehman as Ranjeet Chinoy
 Madan Puri as Balveer Singh 
 Manmohan Krishna as Mr. Mittal 
 Leela Chitnis as Mrs. Mittal 
 Surendra Nath as Mr. Khanna 
 Sumati Gupte as Mrs. Khanna 
 Shashikala as Rani Sahiba 
 Motilal as Public Prosecutor
 Mubarak as Judge
 Badri Prasad as Pandit Uday Shankar 
 Jeevan as Orphanage Warden
 Jagdish Raj as Police Inspector 
 Surender Rahi as Lala Kedarnath's Jailor
 Hari Shivdasani as Lala Hardayal Rai 
 Erica Lal as Special Appearance in song "Aage Bhi Jane Na Tu"

Soundtrack
The film soundtrack was composed by Ravi with lyrics by Sahir Ludhianvi.

Awards and nominations

 13th Filmfare Awards:

Won

 Best Director – Yash Chopra
 Best Supporting Actor – Raaj Kumar
 Best Story – Akhtar Mirza
 Best Dialogue – Akhtar ul Iman
Best Cinematography (Color) – Dharam Chopra

Nominated

 Best Film – B. R. Chopra
 Best Actress – Sadhana

References

Further reading 
During the Malayalam remake of the film in 1981: Kolilakkam, (Shockwave) popular iconic Malayalam action superstar Jayan died during the last scenes of the movie while attempting a helicopter stunt, causing the helicopter to fall down and crash while he was holding on to the rail. His sudden death made him a legendary superstar in the Malayalam film industry.

External links

 Waqt at Rotten Tomatoes
 
  Waqt on YouTube

1965 films
1960s disaster films
1960s Hindi-language films
Indian disaster films
Films directed by Yash Chopra
Films scored by Ravi
Hindi films remade in other languages
Urdu films remade in other languages